In number theory, the Turán sieve is a technique for estimating the size of "sifted sets" of positive integers which satisfy a set of conditions which are expressed by congruences.  It was developed by Pál Turán in 1934.

Description
In terms of sieve theory the Turán sieve is of combinatorial type: deriving from a rudimentary form of the inclusion–exclusion principle.  The result gives an upper bound for the size of the sifted set.

Let A be a set of positive integers ≤ x and let P be a set of primes.  For each p in P, let Ap denote the set of elements of A divisible by p and extend this to let Ad be the intersection of the Ap for p dividing d, when d is a product of distinct primes from P.  Further let A1 denote A itself.  Let z be a positive real number and P(z) denote the product of the primes in P which are ≤ z.  The object of the sieve is to estimate

We assume that |Ad| may be estimated, when d is a prime p by

and when d is a product of two distinct primes d = p q by

where X   =   |A| and f is a function with the property that 0 ≤ f(d) ≤ 1.  Put

Then

Applications
 The Hardy–Ramanujan theorem that the normal order of ω(n), the number of distinct prime factors of a number n, is log(log(n));
 Almost all integer polynomials (taken in order of height) are irreducible.

References
 
 
 
 

Sieve theory